Dacryodes rugosa is a tree in the family Burseraceae. The specific epithet  is from the Latin meaning "wrinkled", referring to the leaflets.

Description
The grey-white bark is smooth to scaly.

Distribution and habitat
Dacryodes rugosa grows naturally in Sumatra, Peninsular Malaysia, Java and Borneo. Its habitat is lowland to hill mixed dipterocarp forests from sea-level to  altitude.

References

rugosa
Trees of Sumatra
Trees of Peninsular Malaysia
Trees of Java
Trees of Borneo
Plants described in 1932